Viktor Németh (born 21 March 1977) is a Hungarian football player who currently plays for Kecskeméti TE.

External links
 Profile

1977 births
Living people
Hungarian footballers
Association football goalkeepers
Dunaújváros FC players
Nyíregyháza Spartacus FC players
Fehérvár FC players
FC Felcsút players
FC Tatabánya players
Kecskeméti TE players
Budaörsi SC footballers
Sportspeople from Székesfehérvár